Tessa Solomon (born January 12, 1979 in Willemstad, Curaçao) is a retired Curaçao swimmer, who specialized in backstroke events. She is a member of the Florida Atlantic Owls swimming and diving team under head coach Steve Eckelkamp, and also, a business graduate at the Florida Atlantic University in Boca Raton, Florida.

Solomon competed for the Netherlands Antilles in the 100 m backstroke at the 2000 Summer Olympics in Sydney. She achieved a FINA B-cut of 1:04.94 from the Pan American Games in Winnipeg, Manitoba, Canada. Swimming in heat two, Solomon decided to scratch out from the race, and then withdrew from the Games for personal and health reasons.

References

External links
Olympic Profile

1979 births
Living people
Dutch Antillean female swimmers
Pan American Games competitors for the Netherlands Antilles
Swimmers at the 1999 Pan American Games
Olympic swimmers of the Netherlands Antilles
Swimmers at the 2000 Summer Olympics
Female backstroke swimmers
Florida Atlantic University alumni
People from Willemstad
Curaçao female swimmers